Macrozamia secunda is a species of plant in the family Zamiaceae. It is endemic to New South Wales, Australia, where rainfall is fairly constant throughout the year. Its seeds are a reddish color and its fronds are generally somewhere between blue and grey in color.

References

External links
Thompson, Creig, and Paul Kennedy. "Macrozamia Secunda." Pacsoa.org. Palm and Cycad Societies of Australia, n.d. Web. 4 Mar. 2013. <http://www.pacsoa.org.au/cycads/Macrozamia/secunda.html>.

secunda
Flora of New South Wales
Cycadophyta of Australia
Endemic flora of Australia
Vulnerable flora of Australia
Taxonomy articles created by Polbot